This was the first edition of the tournament since 2008.

Marcus Daniell and Marcelo Demoliner won the tournament, defeating Ken and Neal Skupski in the final, 7–6(7–3), 6–4.

Seeds

Draw

Draw

References
 Main Draw

Aegon Ilkley Trophy - Doubles
2015 Men's Doubles